John Schwarz may refer to:

 John Henry Schwarz (born 1941), American theoretical physicist
 John J. H. Schwarz (born 1937), American politician
 John E. Schwarz, American political scientist
 John G. Schwarz, business executive and entrepreneur

See also
John Schwartz (disambiguation)